Uncía Municipality is the first municipal section of the Rafael Bustillo Province in the Potosí Department in Bolivia. Its seat is Uncía.

Subdivision 
The municipality consists of the following cantons: 
 Uncía
 Cala Cala (Qala Qala)

Chuqi Uta Canton belonged to the municipality until June 17, 2009, when Chuqi Uta Municipality was created now being the fourth municipal section of the Rafael Bustillo Province.

The people 
The people are predominantly indigenous citizens of Quechua and Aymara descent.

See also 
 Jach'a Jawira (Uncía)

References

External links 
Uncía Municipality: population data and map

Municipalities of Potosí Department